Hu Zhengyue (born 1953 in Zhejiang Province) is Chinese civil servant who served as Assistant Minister of Foreign Affairs of the People's Republic of China between 2008 and 2011.
Hu leads delegations to countries in Asia.

Hu also served as the Ambassador Extraordinary and Plenipotentiary of the PRC to Malaysia between 2001 and 2003.

References

External links
 Hu Zhengyue - Ministry of Foreign Affairs of the People's Republic of China

1953 births
Living people
People's Republic of China politicians from Zhejiang
Chinese diplomats